Roman Tvrdoň (born 29 January 1981) is a Slovak former professional ice hockey player who was drafted in 1999 by the Washington Capitals.

Career statistics

Regular season and playoffs

External links

1981 births
Slovak ice hockey centres
Portland Pirates players
Washington Capitals players
Nottingham Panthers players
Living people
Sportspeople from Trenčín
HC Slovan Bratislava players
Washington Capitals draft picks
Spokane Chiefs players
Expatriate ice hockey players in England
Expatriate ice hockey players in Belarus
Expatriate ice hockey players in Ukraine
Expatriate ice hockey players in Poland
Slovak expatriate ice hockey players in the United States
Slovak expatriate sportspeople in England
Slovak expatriate sportspeople in Belarus
Slovak expatriate ice hockey players in the Czech Republic
Slovak expatriate ice hockey players in Germany
Slovak expatriate sportspeople in  Ukraine
Slovak expatriate sportspeople in  Poland